The Meath Minor Football Championship  is a Gaelic Athletic Association competition organised by the Meath Minor County Board for minor (under-17) Gaelic football clubs in County Meath, Ireland. The current (2022) MFC Division 1 champions of Meath are Donaghmore/Ashbourne. Lower-level teams play in Divisions 2-6.

2017 was the final year of this competition with an under 18 age limit for minor grades – an under 17 championship replaced it after a vote at the GAA congress on 26 February 2016.

The trophy awarded to the winners is the Delaney Cup. 

At the adjourned Meath GAA Annual Convention in the Pavilion at the Showgrounds, Navan on 13 April 1924, a dual proposal from Dulane F.C. and Kilcarn H.C. suggested the formation of a Minor Football competition, with the medals to be provided for the competition if five or more clubs compete. The proposal was intended to persuade the younger generation from engaging in foreign sports such as cricket. The motion was amended to set an age limit of 16 years for the first installment of the competition.  

The draw for the inaugural Meath M.F.C. (conducted on Tuesday 13 May 1924) was as follows: A Division - Navan Harps -vs- De la Salle; Dulane -vs- Bohermeen; Commons -vs- Athlumney. B Division - Salesian College Warrenstown -vs- Curraha; Painestown -vs- Ardcath; Longwood -vs- Donaghmore; Duleek -vs- Walterstown.

Meath M.F.C. Division 1

M.F.C. Division 1 Roll of Honour
The Delany Cup was first presented in 1956 to Navan De la Salle by Mr. Eamon Delany of Laytown.

 The 1944 final was awarded to Clann na Mídhe when it became known that Kells St. Colmcille's played an illegal (over-aged) player.
 The 1940 final was awarded to Kells after they objected to the final result.
 The 1928 final was awarded to the Commons club after it was found that Kilbeg fielded an unregistered player.

Meath M.F.C. Division 1 Top Winners

 The 1944 final was awarded to Clann na Mídhe when it became known that Kells St Colmcille's played an illegal (over-aged) player.
 The 1940 final was awarded to Kells after they objected to the final result.

MFC Division 2 Roll of Honour
This competition was known as the (Minor Football League) M.F.L. Division 2 before 2010.

MFC Division 3 Roll of Honour

MFC Division 4 Roll of Honour

MFC Division 5 Roll of Honour

MFC Division 6 Roll of Honour

U17 Football Special Championship
2017 was the final year of an under 18 age limit for minor grades. In 2017 the inaugural under 17 championship (which from 2018 onwards was known as Minor) was also held along with the Meath M.F.C.

 Division 1: Ratoath 1-17, 0-08 St Peter's Dunboyne,
 Division 2: St Vincent's/Curraha 3-13, 1-08 Simonstown Gaels, 
 Division 3: Ballinabrackey 3-13, 1-04 Clann na nGael,
 Division 4: Dunderry 1-10, 0-11 Moynalty/Carnaross,
 Division 5: Oldcastle 1-11, 1-07 Duleek/Bellewstown,
 Division 6: Jenkinstown Gaels 0-08, 0-06 St Cuthbert's.

References

External links
Official Meath Website
Meath on Hoganstand
Meath Club GAA

Gaelic football competitions in County Meath
Meath GAA